Baeoura is a genus of crane fly in the family Limoniidae.

Species

B. acustyla Alexander, 1964
B. advena (Alexander, 1928)
B. afghanica (Alexander, 1955)
B. aka Alexander, 1969
B. alexanderi Mendl & Tjeder, 1974
B. aliena (Alexander, 1924)
B. angustilobata (Alexander, 1937)
B. angustisterna Alexander, 1966
B. armata Mendl, 1985
B. bilobula Alexander, 1966
B. bistela Alexander, 1966
B. brevipilosa (Alexander, 1920)
B. brumata (Wood, 1952)
B. claripennis (Alexander, 1921)
B. coloneura Alexander, 1964
B. consocia (Alexander, 1935)
B. consona (Alexander, 1936)
B. convoluta (Alexander, 1931)
B. cooksoni (Alexander, 1958)
B. dicladura (Alexander, 1936)
B. dihybosa Alexander, 1964
B. directa (Kuntze, 1914)
B. distans (Brunetti, 1912)
B. ebenina Stary, 1981
B. funebris (Alexander, 1927)
B. furcella Alexander, 1964
B. hemmingseni Alexander, 1978
B. inaequiarmata (Alexander, 1953)
B. irula Alexander, 1966
B. laevilobata (Alexander, 1935)
B. latibasis Alexander, 1969
B. longefiligera Mendl, 1986
B. longicalcarata (Wood, 1952)
B. longiloba Alexander, 1966
B. malickyi Mendl & Tjeder, 1976
B. mediofiligera Savchenko, 1984
B. naga Alexander, 1966
B. nigeriana Alexander, 1972
B. nigrolatera (Alexander, 1920)
B. nigromedia Edwards, 1927
B. nilgiriana (Alexander, 1951)
B. obtusistyla Alexander, 1969
B. palmulata Alexander, 1966
B. perductilis (Alexander, 1938)
B. pilifera Edwards, 1927
B. platystyla Alexander, 1966
B. pollicis (Alexander, 1958)
B. primaeva (Alexander, 1957)
B. producticornis (Alexander, 1960)
B. pubera (Edwards, 1933)
B. schachti Mendl, 1986
B. schmidiana Alexander, 1964
B. semicincta (Alexander, 1925)
B. septentrionalis (Alexander, 1940)
B. setosipes (Alexander, 1936)
B. sternata Alexander, 1964
B. sternofurca Alexander, 1964
B. subnebula (Alexander, 1960)
B. szadziewskii Krzeminski & Stary, 1984
B. taprobanes Alexander, 1966
B. tasmanica (Alexander, 1926)
B. tonnoiri (Alexander, 1926)
B. tricalcarata Alexander, 1966
B. trichopoda  (Alexander, 1930)
B. trihastata (Alexander, 1949)
B. triquetra (Alexander, 1958)
B. trisimilis Alexander, 1966
B. unistylata (Alexander, 1949)
B. witzenbergi (Wood, 1952)

References

Limoniidae
Nematocera genera